Saint Alphonse de Clare is an Acadian community in the Canadian province of Nova Scotia, located in the District of Clare in Digby County. Formerly Chéticamp-de-Clare, the name was changed because there is another Chéticamp in Nova Scotia on Cape Breton. The similar names caused confusion for postal and other services.

June Deveau Gallerie Studio is located in Saint Alphonse.

References

Saint Alphonse de Clare

Communities in Digby County, Nova Scotia
General Service Areas in Nova Scotia